Westport Island, formerly Westport, is a town in Lincoln County, Maine, United States. In the 19th century the island was known as Jeremysquam, a nickname islanders still use for it. The population was 719 at the 2020 census.

Geography
The island is separated from the mainland by two coastal salt-water rivers, the Sheepscot River and the Back River. The island is connected to the mainland at the northwest by one modern bridge, built in 1972 over a slim gap in the Back River called Cowsegan Narrows. Although completely surrounded by water, it is bounded across tidal water by the towns of Wiscasset, Edgecomb, Southport, and Georgetown.

Climate

Demographics

2020 census
As of the census of 2020, there were 719 people, and 378 households in the town. The population density was 81.6 persons per square mile (31.5 per square kilometer). There were 540 housing units at an average density of 61.3 per square mile (23.66 per square kilometer).

There were 378 households, of which 16.4% had children under the age of 18 living with them. 57.1% of households have one or more person 60 years or older. 56.1% of households were married-couple households, 26.5% were male householders with no spouse present, and 12.7% were female householders with no spouse present. The average family size is 2.49 persons per house.

Median Household Income was $73,594, and the poverty rate was 4%. 39.8% of residents hold a bachelor’s degree or higher, while 91.4% have a high school degree or higher.

The median age of Westport Island was 51.7 years. 10.1% was under the age of 18, with 11.5% were between the ages of 18 and 24, and 34.7% were over 65 or older.
.

2010 census
As of the census of 2010, there were 718 people, 329 households, and 227 families living in the town. The racial makeup of the town was 97.8% White, 0.1% African American, 0.3% Native American, 0.3% Asian, 0.4% from other races, and 1.1% from two or more races. Hispanic or Latino of any race were 1.0% of the population.

There were 329 households, of which 21.0% had children under the age of 18 living with them, 57.4% were married couples living together, 6.7% had a female householder with no husband present, 4.9% had a male householder with no wife present, and 31.0% were non-families. 23.1% of all households were made up of individuals, and 9.4% had someone living alone who was 65 years of age or older. The average household size was 2.18 and the average family size was 2.48.

The median age in the town was 52 years. 15.2% of residents were under the age of 18; 4% were between the ages of 18 and 24; 20% were from 25 to 44; 36.9% were from 45 to 64; and 24% were 65 years of age or older. The gender makeup of the town was 49.9% male and 50.1% female.

2000 census
As of the census of 2000, there were 745 people, 318 households, and 228 families living in the town. The racial makeup of the town was 98.26% White, 0.13% African American, 0.67% Native American, and 0.94% from two or more races.

There were 318 households, out of which 26.1% had children under the age of 18 living with them, 62.9% were married couples living together, 6.3% had a female householder with no husband present, and 28.0% were non-families. 24.2% of all households were made up of individuals, and 8.8% had someone living alone who was 65 years of age or older.  The average household size was 2.33 and the average family size was 2.74.

In the town, the population was spread out, with 22.4% under the age of 18, 3.1% from 18 to 24, 24.7% from 25 to 44, 32.6% from 45 to 64, and 17.2% who were 65 years of age or older.  The median age was 45 years. For every 100 females, there were 98.1 males.  For every 100 females age 18 and over, there were 100.7 males.

The median income for a household in the town was $39,010, and the median income for a family was $42,625. Males had a median income of $32,426 versus $27,647 for females. The per capita income for the town was $21,623.  About 5.2% of families and 6.6% of the population were below the poverty line, including 7.6% of those under age 18 and 7.5% of those age 65 or over.

Economics
Fishing is a principal employer for residents of Westport Island, as with much of this part of Maine. Fishermen are most commonly involved in the trapping of lobster and crabs for sale in the local fish markets. Other resources gathered include groundfish, scallops, shrimp, clams, mussels, quahogs, and bloodworms. Other local employers include the Bath Iron Works, a large shipyard where Aegis-class destroyers are built for the US Navy. Many local residents are also involved in cottage industry and building construction services for other town residents.

The median household income is $73,594 and the median family income is $75,139.  Approximately 4% of the population lives under the poverty line.

References

External links
Official town website
Epodunk profile
Maine Genealogy: Westport, Lincoln County, Maine
Westport Island unofficial website

Towns in Lincoln County, Maine
Islands of Lincoln County, Maine
Towns in Maine
Islands of Maine
Coastal islands of Maine